French Valley Airport  is a county-owned public-use airport in southwestern Riverside County, California, located on Highway 79 near the cities of Murrieta and Temecula.

Facilities and aircraft 

For the 12-month period ending December 30, 2009, the airport had 98,185 aircraft operations, an average of 269 per day, all of which were general aviation. There are 170 aircraft based at this airport: 82% single engine, 12% multi-engine, 1% jet aircraft, 2% helicopters and 1% ultralights.

Facilities include The French Valley Cafe which serves three meals a day seven days a week.  Best known for breakfast, the cafe also has a full bar with the occasional happy hour.   Whilst the interior is decorated with air memorabilia and views overlooking the runway they also have a patio which allows for outdoor service.  Due to this they remain open during the COVID-19 pandemic despite a more limited menu. 

There is also Wings and Rotors Air Museum in hangar 7 (Bld 31), with military displays, flyable helicopters and an F-4 Phantom II in restoration to fly.

References

External links 

Airports in Riverside County, California